Cosa Nuestra (Our Thing) is an album by Willie Colón featuring Héctor Lavoe. The album was the first by the duo to become a gold record, followed by La Gran Fuga (1971), El Juicio (1972) and Lo Mato (1973).

Track listing

Personnel
 Willie Colón: leader and trombone
 Héctor Lavoe: lead vocals
 Willie Campbell: trombone
 Kent Gómez: piano
 Santi González: bass
 Milton Cardona: conga
 José Mangual Jr.: bongo, cowbell
 "Little Louie" Romero: timbales
 Producer: Jerry Masucci
 Audio Engineer: Irv Greenbaum
 Recording Director: Johnny Pacheco
 Recording studio: Beltone Studio, New York, New York
 Album photography: Henri Wolfe
 Album design: Izzy Sanabria

See also
 Willie Colón discography

References

1970 albums
Willie Colón albums
Spanish-language albums
Fania Records albums
Albums produced by Johnny Pacheco
Albums produced by Jerry Masucci